Maurice Cottenet (11 February 1895 – 11 April 1972) was a French footballer. He was part of France national football team at the 1924 Summer Olympics, but he did not play in any matches.

References

External links
Profile at French federation official site

1895 births
1972 deaths
French footballers
France international footballers
Olympic footballers of France
Footballers at the 1924 Summer Olympics
AS Cannes players
French football managers
Stade Malherbe Caen managers
AS Cannes managers
Association football goalkeepers